UFC Fight Night: Rodríguez vs. Stephens (also known as UFC Fight Night 159 or UFC on ESPN+ 17) was a mixed martial arts event produced by the Ultimate Fighting Championship that took place on September 21, 2019 at Mexico City Arena in Mexico City, Mexico.

Background
While not officially announced by the organization, the promotion was initially targeting a featherweight bout between former title challengers Brian Ortega and Chan Sung Jung to serve as the event headliner. However, promotion officials elected to go in another direction and a featherweight bout between The Ultimate Fighter: Latin America featherweight winner Yair Rodríguez and Jeremy Stephens served as the main event.

A women's strawweight bout between Istela Nunes and former Invicta FC Strawweight Champion Angela Hill was scheduled for the event. However, on August 12, it was reported that Nunes was removed from the card due to a failed drug test. She was replaced by Ariane Carnelossi.

Alex Perez was scheduled to face Sergio Pettis at the event. However, Perez pulled out of the bout on August 26 citing an injury. He was replaced by promotional newcomer Tyson Nam.

Marion Reneau was scheduled to face Irene Aldana at the event. However, Reneau pulled out of the bout on September 11 for undisclosed reasons. She was replaced by promotional newcomer Vanessa Melo. At the weigh-ins, Melo weighed in at 140 pounds, 4 pounds over the bantamweight non-title fight limit of 136. She was fined 30% of her purse and her bout with Aldana proceeded at a catchweight.

Results

Bonus awards
The following fighters received $50,000 bonuses.
Fight of the Night: Carla Esparza vs. Alexa Grasso
Performance of the Night: Steven Peterson and Paul Craig

See also 

 2019 in UFC
 List of current UFC fighters

References 

UFC Fight Night
2019 in mixed martial arts
Mixed martial arts in Mexico
Sport in Mexico
Sports competitions in Mexico City
2019 in Mexican sports